These hits topped the Dutch Top 40 in 1999 (see 1999 in music).

See also
1999 in music

1999 in the Netherlands
1999 record charts
1999